Kassi Mathias (born 21 November 1986 in Abidjan) is an Ivorian footballer who plays as a defender for Moroccan side Ittihad Tanger.

Club career
He played for many big clubs in Ivory Coast and Benin and has great performance records. In the 2008–09 season, Kassi was named the best defender in all Ivory-Coast League. This performance attracted notice from clubs at home and abroad. He also participated in CAF competition in 2007 for Denguelé. On 31 December 2009, Kassi joined El-Entag El-Harby and was offered a contract after a successful 2-week trial. El-Entag El-Harby and Jeunesse Club d'Abidjan did not agree on transfer fees of $50,000. Therefore, Kassi returned to Jeunesse Club d'Abidjan on 31 January 2010.

References

1986 births
Living people
Ivorian footballers
Ivorian expatriate footballers
Expatriate footballers in Benin
AS Denguélé players
JC d'Abidjan players
Expatriate footballers in Morocco
Footballers from Abidjan
Association football defenders